Nipper's Harbour is a town located on the east coast of the Baie Verte Peninsula of Newfoundland in the Canadian province of Newfoundland and Labrador. This incorporated community of 85 people is located on a rocky inlet that combines Nipper's Harbour and Noble's Cove, and where the primary industry is the inshore fishery. The town is approximately 58 km from Baie Verte.

In 2013, the town voted 98% in favour of resettlement, however the provincial government refused to offer financial compensation to the residents arguing it would be more cost efficient for them to not resettle.

In 2021, the local school, Bayview Primary, closed due to no enrolment.

Etymology 

The derivation of the name is believed to be from the local name for the mosquito, the "jarnipper."

Geography 
Nipper's Harbour is on the east coast of the Baie Verte Peninsula and part of the Notre Dame Bay waterway. By road, it is approximately 200 km north of Deer Lake International Airport, and roughly 650 km northwest via the Trans Canada Highway from the provincial capital, St. John's.

A group of seven small islands (Nipper's Islands) are located approximately one mile offshore from the harbour entrance. The largest island, Seal Island, was the site of a large lighthouse until 40 years ago; the smallest, Gull Island, is a nesting sight for local seagulls.

Demographics 

See also
 Baie Verte Peninsula
 List of cities and towns in Newfoundland and Labrador

References

External links 
Nipper's Harbour - Encyclopedia of Newfoundland and Labrador, vol. 4, p. 82-84.

Populated coastal places in Canada
Towns in Newfoundland and Labrador